Castoponera is a genus of Southeast Asian corinnid sac spiders first described by Christa L. Deeleman-Reinhold in 2001.

Species
 it contains four species:
Castoponera christae Yamasaki, 2016 – Borneo
Castoponera ciliata (Deeleman-Reinhold, 1993) (type) – Malaysia, Indonesia (Sumatra)
Castoponera lecythus Deeleman-Reinhold, 2001 – Borneo
Castoponera scotopoda (Deeleman-Reinhold, 1993) – Borneo

References

Araneomorphae genera
Corinnidae
Spiders of Asia